Irene van Zyl (born 27 November 1984) is a Namibian cricketer and the current captain of the Namibia women's cricket team.

She made her Women's Twenty20 International (WT20I) debut for Namibia on 1 April 2019, against Botswana, during Botswana's tour of Namibia.

In August 2019, she was named in Namibia's squad for the 2019 ICC Women's World Twenty20 Qualifier tournament in Scotland. She played in Namibia's opening match of the tournament, on 31 August 2019, against Ireland. In May 2021, she was named as the captain of the Namibian team for the 2021 Kwibuka Women's T20 Tournament in Rwanda.

References

External links
 

1984 births
Living people
Cricketers from Windhoek
Namibian women cricketers
Namibia women Twenty20 International cricketers
Women cricket captains